The Protestant church of Twijzel or Saint Peter's church is a religious building in Twijzel, Friesland, in the Netherlands. The current church was built in 1692 out of brick and has a triple closed choir. The church is built against the medieval tower that dates from the 13th century. On top of the tower  is a gable roof which was placed in 1787. The Pipe organ was built in 1905 by Bakker & Timmenga from Leeuwarden.
It was originally a Roman Catholic church, becoming a Protestant church after the Protestant Reformation. 
The building is located on Tsjerkebuorren 15. and is listed as a Rijksmonument, number 7054 and is rated with a very high historical value.

References

Achtkarspelen
Twijzel
Rijksmonuments in Friesland
Churches completed in 1692
Protestant churches in the Netherlands